Haanpää is a Finnish surname. Notable people with the surname include:

Ari Haanpää (born 1965), Finnish hockey player
Pentti Haanpää (1905–1955), Finnish author
Samuel Haanpää (born 1986), Finnish basketball player

Finnish-language surnames